Isabella of Aragon may refer to:
Isabella of Aragon, Queen of France, daughter of James I of Aragon and Yolande of Hungary. She was queen consort to Philip III of France and was mother of Philip IV of France.
Isabella of Aragon, Queen of Germany (1305–1330), daughter of James I of Aragon and Blanche of Anjou. She was queen consort to Frederick the Fair
Isabella of Aragon, Countess of Urgell (1380–1424), daughter of Peter IV of Aragon and Sibila of Fortia. She was wife of James II of Urgell
Isabella of Urgell, Duchess of Coimbra, daughter of James II, Count of Urgell and the previous Isabella of Aragon. Married Pedro of Coimbra
Elizabeth of Aragon, aka Isabella, daughter of Peter III of Aragon and Constantia of Sicily; queen consort to Denis of Portugal
Isabella of Aragon, Duchess of Milan, daughter of Alfonso II of Naples and Ippolita Maria Sforza. She was wife of Gian Galeazzo Sforza
Isabella I of Castile, daughter of John II of Castile and Isabel of Portugal. Queen consort of Ferdinand II of Aragon, also known as Isabella I of Aragon
Isabella of Aragon and Castile, daughter of Ferdinand II of Aragon and Isabella I of Castile; queen consort to Manuel I of Portugal
Infanta Isabella Clara Eugenia of Spain, daughter of Philip II of Spain and Elisabeth of Valois; married Archduke Albert of Austria
Isabella II of Spain, daughter of Ferdinand VII of Spain and Maria Christina of the Two Sicilies; Queen of Spain
Isabella, Princess of Asturias (1851–1931), daughter of Isabella II of Spain and Francis of Spain; wife of Prince Gaetan, Count of Girgenti